Ammonite is British-American author Nicola Griffith's debut novel, which was published in 1992. Styled as a meditation on queer ideologies, the novel explores themes of sexuality, gender, illusion, and humanity, as well as virology. While setting aside numerous dogmatic feminist tropes, Griffith fully tackles the conundrum of whether a world run by women would be a gentler or better one. American author Ursula Le Guin cited Ammonite as “a knock-out first novel, with strong, likeable characters, a compelling story, and a very interesting take on gender.

Critically acclaimed and academically praised, it has won several literary awards, including the Lambda Literary Award for LGBT themed science fiction/fantasy, and the Otherwise Award, formerly known as the James Tiptree Jr. Award, for science fiction or fantasy that explores or expands our understanding of gender. In 2008, the Italian translation of Ammonite was awarded the Premio Italia award, an Italian literary prize for astounding works in science fiction and fantasy.  The novel was also shortlisted for the Arthur C. Clarke Award, the British Science Fiction Award, and the Locus Award for a debut novel.

In September 2012 Ammonite was included in the SF Masterworks relaunch series of softcover editions (2010 - present). The series is composed of classic science fiction literature that is deemed important and considered deserving of being in continuous print.

Plot summary
Ammonite is the story of Marghe Taishan, an anthropologist and employee of a government agency, the Settlement and Education Councils (SEC). She is sent as an SEC representative to the planet Jeep (Grenchstom's Planet – "Jeep" being the pronunciation of the abbreviation "GP"). Centuries in the past, Jeep was colonized by people from Earth, but contact was lost with the colony, and now the planet is a target for recolonization by the sinister Durallium Company (mostly referred to as "Company"). Some years prior to the beginning of the story, Company sent an expedition of technical and security personnel (the latter called "Mirrors" for the mirrored helmets on their combat armor) to the planet; a short time later, all of the men and many of the women in the expedition died from a virus, also known as Jeep, which was endemic to the planet. As a result, the planet was placed under quarantine, and none of the surviving members of the expedition have been allowed to leave. One of the mysteries of the planet is that there is a "native" population, entirely female and apparently descended from the original colony.

Marghe is sent to Jeep not only to study the native cultures, but also to test a potential vaccine for the Jeep virus. She makes a journey across Jeep, living with several of its indigenous cultures. Shortly after the start of her journey, she is captured and enslaved by the nomadic Echraidhe, one of whose members, Uaithne, believes herself to be the Death Spirit, the chosen representative of the goddess of death destined to bring about an apocalypse. Escaping the Echraidhe and almost dying in the extreme winter, she reaches the quieter village of Ollfoss, where she joins a family and stops taking the vaccine, accepting the virus into her body and truly learning what it is like to be a native (including how the natives are able to conceive children). She learns the mystic discipline of "deepsearch", and eventually becomes a "viajera", or traveling wise woman. Afterward, she is forced to the center of a conflict between the Mirrors and the Echraidhe under the leadership of Uaithne. Marghe stops the conflict, but shortly thereafter Company, believing the vaccine to have been a failure, destroys the space station orbiting Jeep, apparently isolating the people there. However, Marghe and the Mirrors believe that the Company will probably return one day, a return they must prepare for.

Adaptation to life on Jeep appears to be a greater theme of Griffith's novel, as not only Marghe, but other Company personnel, also eventually are forced to settle on Jeep and adapt to the cultures that its prior colonists have created, in order to adjust to the planetary environment.

Awards & Recoginition

 SF Masterworks series
 The Internet Speculative Fiction Database (ISFDB) Top 100 Novels
 The World Without End (WWEnd) Top Science Fiction Books

References

External links
 Ammonite

1992 British novels
1992 science fiction novels
1990s LGBT novels
British science fiction novels
Feminist science fiction novels
James Tiptree Jr. Award-winning works
Novels by Nicola Griffith
Single-gender worlds
Debut science fiction novels
Lambda Literary Award-winning works
LGBT speculative fiction novels
Del Rey books
British LGBT novels
1992 debut novels
Grafton (publisher) books